The Battle of Vaksince was a military engagement between the Macedonian security forces and Albanian insurgents belonging to the NLA, which was at the time launching a campaign of guerrilla attacks against facilities of the Macedonian Government, the Macedonian Police force, and the Macedonian Armed Forces.

Timeline

NLA Attack and Macedonian Counter-offensive 
In May 2001, NLA rebels led by Fadil Nimani infiltrated Macedonia and set up bases in several villages to the north of Kumanovo.

On 3 May, the NLA launched an attack on Macedonian security forces in Vaksince, near Kumanovo, killed two Macedonian soldiers and kidnapped a third. The NLA then went on to occupy the village and declared the area in and around Vakcince as "liberated zone".

On the same day Macedonian Forces decided to launch an Counter-Offensive to reclaim the village seized by th NLA. Macedonian Forces began the offensive with helicopter gunships and artillery that fired on and around the village of Vaksince

Macedonian Army officials claimed to have managed to destroy fourteen NLA entrenched positions, eight machine-gun bunkers, seven sniper nests, six control points, three arms storage facilities, and one mortar position during the Offensive.

During the Offensive 3 Macedonian Soldiers were wounded, the NLA also claimed to have shot down one MI-24 Attack Helicopter.

Army spokesman Gjordji Trendafilov told the Associated Press that the NLA was holding thousands of villagers as human shields. This was denied by the NLA, who also accused government forces of indiscriminate attacks against Albanian civilians.

Second Macedonian Offensive 
On 24 May 2001, Macedonian security forces launched another general offensive against the NLA in Kumanovo. Fighting continued into the next day and turned into urban warfare. The police and army infantry had to fight for every house in the large villages of Vaksince and Lojane, two NLA strongholds, as the NLA resisted fiercely. A special police unit called the "Tigers", who specialised in urban counter-guerrilla fighting, was also deployed. On 26 May, NLA rebels withdrew to the Hills around Vaksince. With the withdrawal of the NLA, the Macedonian security forces moved in and recaptured Vaksince. During the clashes, Fadil Nimani, main commander of the NLA in Vaksince, fell in battle, while one Macedonian Soldier was wounded.

NLA rebels said, they would attack and try to recapture the village, as soon as all civilians were evacuated from the village.

NLA Counter-Offensive 
Although the Macedonian Army captured Vaksince on 26 may, it took less than 3 Days for the NLA to regain territory in Vaksince.

On 6 June, the NLA retook Vaksince, Georgi Trendafilov denied that the army had been forced out and claimed that there were no "terrorists" in Vaksince and that the army was still in its positions. Nevertheless the Macedonian army shelled Vaksince on 6 June, setting a house on fire, which would be unlikely if they still had occupied the area.

On 7 June, Hysamedin Halili (then Mayor of the Lipkovo Municipality) confirmed that the NLA recaptured Vaksince.

Aftermath 
In October, Macedonian forces attempted to raid Vaksince, but were stopped and forced to withdraw by the NLA.

The Human Rights Watch, later found out, that Macedonian Forces were arresting and beating Albanian civilias during and after their Offensive from 24-26 May 2001.

References

See also 
Insurgency in the Republic of Macedonia

Kumanovo Municipality
Lipkovo Municipality
2001 insurgency in Macedonia
Battles in 2001